Jindřich Skácel (born 3 November 1979) is a former Czech football goalkeeper. He made over 50 appearances in the Czech First League. Skácel played international football at under-21 level for Czech Republic U21.

Skácel, who was born in Prostějov, rose to fame as a 17-year-old goalkeeper while playing Czech First League football for SK Sigma Olomouc. During his time at Olomouc, he also appeared for the club in the UEFA Cup. He later went to SK Slavia Prague on a 12-month loan, although he didn't make a first-team league appearance for the club and only played for the reserve team in the third-tier Bohemian Football League.

After four years outside the top flight, Skácel signed a contract with FC ViOn Zlaté Moravce who were playing in the 2007–08 Slovak Superliga.

References

External links
 
 

1979 births
Living people
Sportspeople from Prostějov
Czech footballers
Czech Republic youth international footballers
Czech Republic under-21 international footballers
Association football goalkeepers
Czech First League players
Czech National Football League players
SK Sigma Olomouc players
SK Slavia Prague players
FK Drnovice players
1. FK Příbram players
FC Zbrojovka Brno players
FC Sellier & Bellot Vlašim players
FC Fastav Zlín players
SC Xaverov players
FK Mutěnice players
FC Slovan Rosice players
Slovak Super Liga players
FC ViOn Zlaté Moravce players
Czech expatriate footballers
Expatriate footballers in Slovakia
Czech expatriate sportspeople in Slovakia